Russel L. Honoré (born September 15, 1947) is a retired lieutenant general who served as the 33rd commanding general of the U.S. First Army at Fort Gillem, Georgia. He is best known for serving as commander of Joint Task Force Katrina responsible for coordinating military relief efforts for Hurricane Katrina–affected areas across the Gulf Coast and as the 2nd Infantry Division's commander while stationed in South Korea. He served until his retirement from the Army on January 11, 2008. Honoré is sometimes known as "The Ragin' Cajun".

Early life and education
A native of Lakeland in Pointe Coupee Parish, Louisiana, and 9th of 12 children, born to a Louisiana Créole family who settled in Pointe Coupée Parish. The Honoré family surname is still found among the Cane River Créoles.

Honoré earned a B.S. in vocational agriculture from Southern University and A&M College in 1971. He also holds an M.A. in human resources from Troy University as well as an honorary D.P.A. from Southern University and A&M College. He has received leadership development training from the international civilian Center for Creative Leadership.

Career
Prior to his appointment on July 15, 2004, as Commander, First United States Army, Honoré served in a variety of command and staff positions in South Korea and Germany. He served as Commanding General, 2nd Infantry Division in South Korea; Vice Director for Operations, J-3, The Joint Staff, Washington, D.C.; Deputy Commanding General and Assistant Commandant, United States Army Infantry Center and School, Fort Benning, Georgia; and Assistant Division Commander, Maneuver/Support, 1st Cavalry Division, Fort Hood, Texas. 
 
On June 13, 2002, in South Korea, soldiers from the 2nd Infantry Division were on a training mission near the North Korean border when their vehicle hit and killed two 14-year-old girls on a narrow public road. In July 2002, the U.S. military indicted Sgt. Mark Walker and Sgt. Fernando Nino on charges of negligent homicide. They were later found not guilty. Honoré (then a major general) responded by visiting the victims' parents and promising the U.S. military would build a memorial near the accident site to honor the girls.

On January 15, 2021, Speaker of the House Nancy Pelosi announced that Honoré would lead a review of security failures following the U.S. Capitol attack that will focus on "security infrastructure, interagency processes and procedures, and command and control".

Hurricane Katrina and Hurricane Rita
On August 31, 2005, Honoré was designated commander of Joint Task Force Katrina responsible for coordinating military relief efforts for Hurricane Katrina-affected areas across the Gulf Coast. Honoré's arrival in New Orleans came after what was widely believed to be a poor performance by state and local agencies, the Federal Emergency Management Agency (FEMA) and its director Michael D. Brown. He gained media celebrity and accolades for his apparent turning around of the situation in the city as well as his gruff management style which contrasted with what many felt were the empty platitudes of civilian officials. In one widely played video clip, Honoré was seen on the streets New Orleans, barking orders to subordinates and, in one case, berating local police officers who were displaying their weapons as they rode past him. "Weapons down! Weapons down, damn it!" Honoré shouted. New Orleans Mayor Ray Nagin was quoted on a radio interview on September 1, 2005, saying: "Now, I will tell you this—and I give the president some credit on this—he sent one John Wayne dude down here that can get some stuff done, and his name is Gen. Honoré. And he came off the doggone chopper, and he started cussing and people started moving. And he's getting some stuff done." Stars and Stripes, the unofficial newspaper of the United States Armed Forces, reported that Honoré had previous experience dealing with flooding at many South Korean bases during monsoon season and supervised the installation of flood control measures.

On September 20, 2005, at a press conference with Nagin on Hurricane Rita, Honoré made headlines nationwide when he told a reporter not to get "stuck on stupid" in reference to a question about the government response to Hurricane Katrina.

Hurricane Maria comments

After Hurricane Maria devastated Puerto Rico in 2017, Honoré described the situation in the U.S. territory as being "like a war" and said it was significantly worse than New Orleans in the aftermath of Katrina. Honoré criticized the Trump administration's response to the crisis, saying it demanded a greater and more rapid response, with a larger commitment of U.S. troops to provide emergency assistance, and told CNN anchor Erin Burnett.

U.S. Capitol attack security review
As a result of the 2021 United States Capitol attack, Speaker Nancy Pelosi announced on January 15, 2021, that Honoré would lead an investigation into the incident. He suggested that fencing should be installed and discussed shortcomings in security. He was vocal on Twitter about the response of the United States Capitol Police officers, calling it a "s**t show".

In a letter to Speaker Nancy Pelosi by Representative Matt Gaetz, he was criticized for statements he made in regards to certain members of Congress, specifically for Senator Josh Hawley to be "run out of D.C." and Representative Lauren Boebert needing to be put on a no fly list.

Politics
In late August 2009, there were reports that Honoré would run for U.S. Senate in 2010 in his native Louisiana as a Republican against incumbent Republican Senator David Vitter. On August 31, when asked on CNN about the reports, Honoré expressed admiration for individuals who aspire to serve in public office but said that he had no plans to seek the Senate seat, as he was unlikely to win with the viewpoints he currently holds.

Personal life
Honoré describes himself as an "African-American Creole", a combination that includes French, African, American Indian and Spanish ancestry. He was raised Catholic.

During the halftime of the Independence Bowl in Shreveport, Louisiana, on December 30, 2005, Honoré was honored with the Omar N. Bradley "Spirit of Independence Award" because of his leadership in the recovery of New Orleans after Hurricane Katrina.

Honoré was also awarded the Key to the City Award to New Orleans in Recognition of his Exemplary Military Service during the third anniversary of Katrina ceremonies.

Honoré resides in Baton Rouge, Louisiana with his wife, Beverly, and their four children. He founded GreenARMY, an environmental group, and has criticized excessive groundwater use by ExxonMobil and Georgia-Pacific in Baton Rouge, and their close relationship with the Capital Area Groundwater Conservation Commission that oversees and regulates water use by these corporations.

Awards and decorations

   Defense Distinguished Service Medal with oak leaf cluster
   Army Distinguished Service Medal with oak leaf cluster
   Defense Superior Service Medal
   Legion of Merit (four Oak Leaf Clusters)
   Bronze Star
   Defense Meritorious Service Medal
   Meritorious Service Medal (three Oak Leaf Clusters)
   Army Commendation Medal (three Oak Leaf Clusters)
   Army Achievement Medal
   Joint Meritorious Unit Award with two oak leaf clusters
   Army Superior Unit Award
   National Defense Service Medal (two Bronze Service Stars)
   Armed Forces Expeditionary Medal
   Southwest Asia Service Medal (one Bronze Service Star)
   Global War on Terrorism Service Medal
   Korean Defense Service Medal
   Armed Forces Service Medal
   Humanitarian Service Medal
   Army Service Ribbon
   Overseas Service Ribbon (with numeral 4)
   Kuwait Liberation Medal (Saudi Arabia)
   Kuwait Liberation Medal (Kuwait)

   Expert Infantryman Badge
   Basic Parachutist Badge
   Office of the Joint Chiefs of Staff Identification Badge

See also

 List of Louisiana Creoles
 List of Southern University alumni
 List of Troy University alumni

References

External links

 generalhonore.com, official website of General Honoré, LLC
 
 
 National Veteran's Day profile
 Department of Defense article
 "Theater Immersion Postmobilization Training in the First Army", by Lieutenant General Russel L. Honoré & Colonel Daniel L. Zajac
 Pentagon deploys ships, helicopters, rescuers to hurricane-ravaged areas
 Article on cnn.com about Honoré
 Associated Press profile on Honoré
 "The Category 5 General:" Washington Post "Style" Section Article (September 12, 2005)
 Russel Honoré on why he apologized for the death of teens caused by U.S. servicemen in South Korea
 The US Embassy to South Korea's response on the deaths
 Video of September 20, 2005, press conference
 Transcript and audio of September 20, 2005, press conference
 Omar N. Bradley "Spirit of Independence Award"
 Floodlines, Episode V "Exodus"

1947 births
Living people
African-American United States Army personnel
American people of West Indian descent
Louisiana Creole people
Louisiana Republicans
People from Pointe Coupee Parish, Louisiana
Recipients of the Defense Distinguished Service Medal
Recipients of the Defense Superior Service Medal
Recipients of the Distinguished Service Medal (US Army)
Recipients of the Legion of Merit
Southern University alumni
Troy University alumni
United States Army generals
Recipients of the Humanitarian Service Medal
African-American Catholics
21st-century African-American people
20th-century African-American people